El Ritmo Mundial (Spanish for The World Rhythm) Released in 1988 is the third studio album of the Argentine Ska, Reggae band Los Fabulosos Cadillacs. Recorded and edited in 1988, in this album the band expands their musical range to more current commercial genres. The album now includes the classic Ska along with the apparition of a couple of ballads "Siempre me Hablaste de Ella" and "No. 2 en tu Lista".

The singles were "Revolution Rock", "Conversacion Nocturna" and the immortal "Vasos Vacios" in which the famous Cuban singer Celia Cruz performs a duo with Vicentico.

Track listing 

 "Es Tan Lejos de Aquí" ("It's So Far Away From Here")  (Vicentico, Flavio Cianciarulo) – 3:42
 "Revolution Rock" (Jackie Edwards, Danny Ray) – 4:55
 "Vasos Vacíos" ("Empty Glasses") (Vicentico) – 4:37
 "Siempre Me Hablaste de Ella" ("You Always Talked to me About Her") (Cianciarulo) – 2:52
 "Botella de Humo" ("Smoke Bottle") (Sergio Rotman) – 2:26
 "Conversación Nocturna" ("Night Time Conversation") (Rigozzi, Ricciardi, Siperman, Vicentico) – 3:30
 "Tengo Solamente Dos Maneras de Estar Cerca del Cielo" ("I Only Have Two Ways of Being Close to Heaven") (Vicentico, Cianciarulo) – 2:57
 "Más Solo Que la Noche Anterior" ("Lonelier than Last Night") (Vicentico, Cianciarulo) – 3:58
 "El No. 2 En Tu Lista" ("The No. 2 in Your List") (Vicentico) – 3:52
 "Twist y Gritos" ("Twist and Shouts") (Phil Medley, Bert Russell) – 2:30
 "Te Tiraré del Altar" ("I`ll Throw you Off the Altar") (Vicentico, Giugno) – 2:11

Personnel 

 Vicentico – vocals
 Flavio Cianciarulo – bass
 Anibal Rigozzi – guitar
 Mario Siperman – keyboard
 Fernando Ricciardi – drums
 Luciano Giugno – percussion
 Naco Goldfinger – tenor saxophone
 Sergio Rotman – alto saxophone
 Daniel Lozano – trumpet & flugelhorn

External links 
 Los Fabulosos Cadillacs Official Web Site
El Ritmo Mundial at MusicBrainz
[ El Ritmo Mundial] at Allmusic

Los Fabulosos Cadillacs albums
Sony Music Argentina albums
1988 albums